The 2014–15 USC Upstate Spartans women's basketball team will represent the University of South Carolina Upstate in the 2014–15 NCAA Division I women's basketball season. The Spartans were coached by tenth year head coach Tammy George and were members of the Atlantic Sun Conference. They finished the season 14-16, 7-9 in A-Sun play for a three way tie for a fourth-place finish. They lost in the quarterfinals of the 2015 Atlantic Sun women's basketball tournament to Northern Kentucky.

Media
All home games and conference road will be shown on ESPN3 or A-Sun.TV. Non conference road games will typically be available on the opponents website.

Roster

Schedule

|-
!colspan=9 style="background:#085435; color:white;"|Regular Season

|-
!colspan=9 style="background:white;"|2015 Atlantic Sun Tournament

See also
 2014–15 USC Upstate Spartans men's basketball team

References

USC Upstate
USC Upstate Spartans women's basketball seasons
USC Upstate
USC Upstate